is a 2017 Japanese animated romantic comedy film directed by Masaaki Yuasa. The film is based on the 2006 novel The Night Is Short, Walk on Girl written by Tomihiko Morimi and illustrated by Yusuke Nakamura, who also served as the film's original character designer. The film was released in North America as The Night Is Short, Walk On Girl, with a leading article added, but in other English-speaking regions without one. It has been awarded the Grand Prize for Best Animated Feature at the Ottawa International Animation Festival and the Japan Academy Prize for Animation of the Year.

The film is a spiritual sequel to The Tatami Galaxy, also based on a novel written by Morimi and directed by Yuasa. Though both works share a Kyoto University setting and some characters, the plotlines are largely unrelated.

Plot
The senpai plans to confess his romantic feelings for the kōhai to her that night, though circumstances keep them separated for a majority of the evening.

The kōhai meets a pervert, Tōdō, at a bar. She wins the admiration of two other patrons, Higuchi and Hanuki, after punching Tōdō when he makes an advance on her. Higuchi and Hanuki lead the kōhai in gate crashing strangers' parties, where she drinks an impressive amount of alcohol. She later participates in a drinking game with Rihaku, a supernatural being, and wins.

Meanwhile, the senpai and kōhai both go to a used book festival to search for a picture book from the kōhai'''s childhood. There, Rihaku is hosting a spicy food eating contest making used book enthusiasts compete to select a book from his rare collection. The senpai notices that kōhai's picture book is amongst the collection, and competes. He wins the book, but the contest is interrupted by the God of Used Book Festivals (aided by the kōhai) who redistributes all of Rikaku's books back to the festival at reasonable prices  

After obtaining the book, the senpai and the kōhai both go to the school festival. Senpai learns that the kōhai is to play the lead in the final scene of a guerilla theatre production. He attempts to replace the male lead in the scene, but is unsuccessful. Having caught a cold, the senpai returns home.

The kōhai visits the companions she has met throughout the night, all of whom have caught the same cold as the senpai, and nurses them back to health. Her final visit is to the senpai, who gives her the copy of Ratatatam and suggests visiting a used bookstore together, to which she enthusiastically assents. The film ends with the two meeting for coffee before going to the bookstore.

Cast

Production
The film was made by most of the same lead staff as The Tatami Galaxy, including original author Morimi, original character designer Nakamura, character designer and chief supervising animator Nobutaki Itō, screenwriter Makoto Ueda and director Yuasa.

The band Asian Kung-Fu Generation also returned to write and perform the theme song .

To promote the film's release in South Korea, in addition the Korean band Romantic Punch were employed to create an image song, "Moonwalk in Kyoto" (밤은 짧아 걸어 아가씨야) (the Korean title of the song is the same as that of the novel and film).

ReleaseNight Is Short, Walk On Girl was released in Japan on April 7, 2017.

Internationally, the film was released by Anime Limited in the United Kingdom and Ireland on October 4, 2017, and by GKIDS in the United States on August 21, 2018 (where it is titled The Night Is Short, Walk On Girl). In Australia, Half Symbolic Films released the film in cinemas on 14 February 2019. An English dub of the film was released on HBO Max on January 12, 2021.

Rights to the English-language edition of the original novel have been acquired by Yen Press, who published it on June 18, 2019, as The Night Is Short, Walk On Girl, in hardcover and as an e-book.

In the United States, the home-video Blu-ray release of Night Is Short, Walk On Girl has earned an estimated total of $370,620 as of December 2021, per financials reported on The Numbers.

On June 17, 2022, The Night is Short, Walk on Girl will screen at New York City's Japan Society (Manhattan) as part of their Monthly Anime Series.

Reception

Critical reception
On review aggregator Rotten Tomatoes, the film holds a 90% approval rating based on 31 reviews, with an average rating of 7.3/10. The website's critics consensus reads, "Inventively animated, boldly creative, and refreshingly ambitious, The Night Is Short, Walk On Girl'' should resonate deeply with fans of outré anime." Metacritic, which uses a weighted average, assigned the film a score of 65 out of 100 based on 7 critics, indicating "generally favorable reviews".

Awards and nominations

References

External links
  
  
 
 
 
 

2017 anime films
2017 romantic comedy films
2010s Japanese-language films
Animated romance films
Anime comedy films
Anime films based on novels
Films about alcoholic drinks
Films about books
Films based on Japanese novels
Films scored by Michiru Ōshima
Films set in Kyoto
Japan Academy Prize for Animation of the Year winners
Japanese romantic comedy films
Kadokawa Dwango franchises
Noitamina
Romantic comedy anime and manga
Science Saru
Toho animated films